Parshley is an unincorporated community in southern Jasper County, in the U.S. state of Missouri.

The community lies just south of Interstate 44 between Sarcoxie and Joplin. The Jasper-Newton county line is approximately one mile south of the village.

History
A post office called Parshley was established in 1890, and remained in operation until 1901. The community was named after a local merchant.

References

Unincorporated communities in Jasper County, Missouri
Unincorporated communities in Missouri